Mirabile Township is one of twelve townships in Caldwell County, Missouri, and is part of the Kansas City metropolitan area with the USA.  As of the 2000 census, its population was 362.  Mirabile is also the name of the school district.

History
Mirabile is derived from a Latin word meaning "wonderful".

Geography
It contains three cemeteries: Hill, Morris and Paxton.

The streams of Brushy Creek, Plum Creek, Sheep Creek and Willow Branch run through this township.

References

External links
 US-Counties.com
 City-Data.com

Townships in Caldwell County, Missouri
Townships in Missouri